Mirit Cohen (1945, Russia – May 3, 1990, New York City) was a Russian-born Israeli sculptor and painter. Cohen resided in New York City from 1975. In 1990, she committed suicide.

Biography 
Manya Malka (later Mirit) Cohen) was born in Russia to a socialist and Zionist family. Her father, Haim Cohen, a Polish Jew, was born in Lodz, and fled during the Second World War to Russia, where he met her mother Rebecca – A Russian woman of Jewish descent. After the war, her family immigrated to Mandatory Palestine. They  were deported to a detention camp in Cyprus. In 1948, after the establishment of Israel, the family  settled in Givat Shmuel.

In 1956 Cohen was sent to study at Kibbutz Kfar Masaryk. In 1958  she  won a youth drawing competition in Japan. Three years later, Cohen moved back with her parents and began attending high school in Bnei Brak. During this period she became active in the Communist youth movement in Petah Tikva. For her last years in high school she attended Hadash High School in Tel Aviv.

After her military service, Cohen worked as a clerk in the Israel Export Institute in the textile and fashion department. In 1968 she studied at the Avni Institute of Art and Design with Yehezkel Streichman. In  1969 she enrolled at the "Midrasha" drawing and art school in Tel Aviv.

In the early 1980s she was briefly married to Michael Dissent. Under the influence of LSD Cohen experienced a psychotic attack and was hospitalized in Bat Yam.

In 1990, Cohen committed suicide by jumping from a building in New York. She was buried in the Jewish cemetery in the borough of Queens.

Art career
In 1972 Cohen had her first exhibition at Dugit Gallery in Tel Aviv.  In 1974 the Israeli curator Yona Fisher bought some of her works for the Israel Museum in Jerusalem.

In the spring of 1975 Cohen won a scholarship from the America-Israel Cultural Foundation. With the help of this scholarship she studied at the School of Visual Arts in New York in 1975–1977, after which she continued to live in the United States.

Education
 1977	Graduated from School of Visual Arts, New York City, USA.
 1971	Graduated  from Teachers College of Art, Ramat Hsharon, Israel.
 1968	Studied at Avni Art Institute with Yehezkel Streichman, Tel-Aviv, Israel.
 1967	Graduated from Kalisher Art College, Tel-Aviv, Israel.

Exhibitions

Selected solo exhibitions
2000	Dan Weinberg Gallery, Los Angeles, California, USA.	
1999	Nolan / Eckman Gallery, New York City, USA.
1998	Ulmer Museum, Ulm, Germany. (Published a Catalogue)
1994	The Israel Museum, Jerusalem, Israel.
1991	La MaMa Gallery, New York City, USA.
1982	"Woman with Cooper Snakes," Live Performance Sculpture, Soho, New York City, USA.
1980–81	"Cooper Bridges," "From Fire Escape to Fire Escape", Site Sculpture, Union Square and Cooper Square, New York 		City, USA.
1979	"The Broken Vessels Project", PS 1, New York City, USA.
1978	"Broken Vessels", Julie M. Gallery, Tel-Aviv, Israel.
1977–78	"Metal, Mental, Melted, Metal", Sculpture Installation, Clock Tower, New York City, USA.
1972–73	Dugit Gallery, Tel-Aviv, Israel.

Selected group exhibitions
2011	July–August; "העצב החשוף"    Yair Gallery, Tel Aviv, Israel.
2010	Artists' Choices: "A work in Progress,"& "Drawings," The Israel Museum, Jerusalem, Israel.
2009	"The collection of Amie & Gabie Brown," Museum Ein Harod, Israel.
2009	"Lost Little Worlds - Works in Small Format" Gordon Gallery, Tel Aviv, Israel.
2008	"Near and Seen" The Open Museum, Tephen, Israel.
2003	"Side Effect" Beit Berl Galleries, Israel.
2005	"Self Portrait" Alon Segev gallery, Tel Aviv, Israel.
2004 	"The 70's", Tel Aviv Museum, Tel Aviv, Israel.
2003	"Shemesh," Tel Aviv Museum, Tel Aviv, Israel.
2001	"Arturo Schwartz Collection of Israeli Artists," The Israel Museum, Jerusalem, Israel.
2000	"A Wall of My Own, Israeli Art," from the collection of Benno Kalev, Tel Aviv Museum, Tel Aviv, Israel.
1998	"Women Artists in Israeli Art", 1948–1998, Haifa Museum, Haifa, Israel.
1998	"Israeli Art of the 70's", Tel-Aviv Museum, Tel-Aviv; Israel.
1996	"Diary of a Human Hand," Bard College Art Center, New York State. Tel Aviv Museum, Tel-Aviv.
1995	Rita & Arturo Schwarz Collection of Israeli Art, The Israel Museum, Jerusalem, Israel.
1994	"Anxiety," ("Charada") The Museum of Contemporary Israeli Art, Ramat-Gan, Israel
1990	"Small Works", New York University, New York City, USA.
1987	Artist calendar of the Year, Histadrut Publication, Tel-Aviv, Israel.
1989	"Bullet Under Acme", Great Jones Gallery, New York City, USA.
1984	Israel Museum, Jerusalem, Israel.
1983	Gordon Gallery, Tel-Aviv, Israel.
1980	"Lines & Drawings" Israel Museum, Jerusalem, Israel. Gimel Gallery, Jerusalem, Israel.
1980	"New York Veil," Soho, New York City, USA.
1978	Tel-Aviv Museum, Julie M. Gallery, Tel-Aviv; Israel Museum, Jerusalem, Israel.
1975	Richter Gallery, Julie M. Gallery & Artist Association, Tel-Aviv, Israel.
1975	Israel Museum and  Debel Gallery, Jerusalem, Israel.							
1974	"Drawings & More" Israel Museum, Jerusalem; Bertha Urdang Gallery, New York City, US.
1973	Julie M. Gallery, Yodfat Gallery, Mabat Gallery, Dugit Gallery, Tel-Aviv. Debel Gallery, Jerusalem, Israel.
1972	Dugit Gallery, Tel Aviv, Israel.

Awards and recognition
1995        Ministry of Culture and Education, Museums and Visual Arts Dep., Israel
1978 	Con Edison Artist In Residence Program, NY
1975–77	American Israel Cultural Foundation. Art and Urban Resources, New York City
1969–71	Sharet Grant. Pnina Mandleblit Fund, Israel

Public collections
2000–07	Ulmer Museum, Ulm, Germany.
2000	The National Gallery of Art, Washington DC., USA
2000	The Phoenix Collection of Israeli Art.
1997	The walker Museum, Minneapolis, Minnesota, USA.
1974–95	The Israel Museum, Jerusalem, Israel.
1975	The Israeli embassy, Washington DC, USA
1976–99	The Tel Aviv Museum, Tel Aviv.

Selected reviews
2008	Haaretz, Dana Gilerman.
2006	Haaretz, Dalia Manor, Highlights from the Tel Aviv Museum of Art. August 6, 2006
2000	Art in America, April 2000, USA. Hayr, Ruti Deirector, May 5, 2000; "Private Wall" Benno Kalev collection: Haaretz, Uzi Zur, May 12 (p 14b); Maariv, Adam Baruch, April 28; "Family Tie" Hayr, Ruti Deirector, May 5, 2000.
1999	New York Times, November 26, 1999. The Jewish Week, November 26, 1999.
1998	Various German news papers in Ulm and Berlin, Germany. August / September 1998.
1991	Yediot Ahchronot America, "To Fuse the Broken," Riki Turk. Cover Magazine, "Mirit Cohen," Alan Moore.
1983	"Second Visit," from the Gordon Gallery collection, Gabi Ben Jano
1981	National Arts Guide (Exxon Guggenheim Exhibit), Peter Frank, New York City
1977	Yediot Ahchronot, Israeli Artist in New York, Adam Baruch.
1972–77	Art Magazines: Gazit (1972), Musage (1975), Kave (1984), and many principal Israeli newspapers

Selected books
2006	Highlights from the Tel Aviv Museum, Dr. Mordechai Omer (ed), 100 years of Art in Israel, Gidon Ofrat.
2000	Wool From The Loom, Ed. Nathan Wasserman, Hebrew University, Jerusalem, Magnes Press.
2000	The Seventh Column /  Natan Alterman. Israeli Art from Benno Kalev Collection, United Kibbutz Publication.
1987	"The Redefinition of Art in Israel", Art in Israel by Amnon Barzel. Milan, Italy
The New Generation, Gideon Offrat & Binyamin Tamuz.
Israeli Art History, Gila Cohen-Ballas

See also
Israeli art

References 

1945 births
1990 deaths
1990 suicides
20th-century Israeli sculptors
20th-century Israeli painters
20th-century Israeli women artists
Israeli conceptual artists
Israeli contemporary artists
Jewish Israeli artists
Jewish women sculptors
Modern sculptors
Israeli women painters
Artists who committed suicide
Suicides by jumping in New York City
Russian emigrants to Israel
Russian Jews
Russian people of Polish-Jewish descent
Israeli people of Russian-Jewish descent
Israeli people of Polish-Jewish descent
Israeli expatriates in the United States
Russian people of Israeli descent
Women conceptual artists
Jewish women painters
Israeli women sculptors